Senator Dwinell may refer to:

Frank A. Dwinell (1848–1928), Vermont State Senate
Lane Dwinell (1906–1997), New Hampshire State Senate
William S. Dwinnell (1862–1930), Minnesota State Senate